= Miljevina coal mine =

Miljevina Coal Mine
- Location within Republika Srpska Location within Bosnia and Herzegovina
- Location: Miljevina, Foča Municipality, Republika Srpska, Bosnia and Herzegovina; 43°30′39″N 18°38′32″E
- Products: Lignite

The Miljevina Coal Mine is a coal mine located in the eastern part of Republika Srpska. The mine has coal reserves amounting to 77.1 million tonnes of lignite, one of the largest coal reserves in Europe and the world. The mine has an annual production capacity of 0.1 million tonnes of coal. Miljevina power station construction is under consideration.
